António Conceição da Silva Oliveira (born 6 December 1961), known as Toni Conceição, is a Portuguese football manager and former player who played as a right-back.

His playing career was spent mostly in the Primeira Liga at Braga, as well as Vizela and one appearance for Porto. He earned a sole cap for Portugal in 1988.

In a managerial career of over two decades, Conceição led a variety of Portuguese teams and won league and cup honours in three spells with Cluj in Romania. He also managed Cameroon to third place at the 2021 Africa Cup of Nations.

Playing career
Born in Maximinos, Braga District, Conceição played one full decade as a professional, making his debut in the Primeira Liga with local S.C. Braga. In 1984, he helped F.C. Vizela reach the top division for the first time in the club's history.

Subsequently, Conceição returned to Braga. He appeared in a career-best 36 games in the 1987–88 season, helping his team to the 11th position whilst acting as the captain.

Conceição signed for FC Porto in the summer of 1989. After only one competitive appearance in two years he retired at the age of 29, eventually returning late in the decade in futsal. He earned one cap for Portugal, featuring the full 90 minutes in a 0–0 friendly against Sweden in Gothenburg, on 12 October 1988.

Coaching career
Conceição started his managerial career at S.C. Braga B, spending three full seasons in the third division. He acted as interim to the first team during one match late into 2002–03, a 2–2 away draw against S.C. Beira Mar.

In the following years, Conceição worked with Associação Naval 1º de Maio, C.F. Estrela da Amadora, Vitória de Setúbal and C.D. Trofense, with all sides but the third competing in the Segunda Liga and all attaining promotion. In January 2009 he moved abroad, being appointed at Liga I's CFR Cluj and winning the Cupa României. He was dismissed by the latter as they led the table after 15 rounds.

After three months at the helm of C.F. Os Belenenses after signing in December 2009, winning only three games in 16 and suffering top-flight relegation, Conceição returned to Romania, where he coached SR Brașov and FC Astra Ploiești.

Conceição returned to his country in October 2012, being appointed at Braga B who were having their first experience in the second tier. He then led Moreirense F.C. to the division two championship, leaving at the end of the campaign.

Conceição was subsequently appointed at S.C. Olhanense of the same division. Though expected to win promotion, he was sacked in October 2014 with the side in the bottom half of the table following a 7–0 loss at FC Porto B. After a spell at Al Faisaly FC of the Saudi Professional League, he returned to Cluj in December 2015. The following 17 May his team – featuring compatriots Tiago Lopes, Camora and Vítor Bruno – won the cup again with a penalty shootout victory over FC Dinamo București.

In March 2017, Conceição was hired by Nea Salamis Famagusta FC, second in the Cypriot First Division. Three months later he came home to take the reins at F.C. Penafiel of the second tier, leaving on 25 September by mutual consent after two wins from seven league games and elimination from both cups.

On 26 July 2018, Conceição began his third spell at Cluj. He was sacked the following 19 February after a run of three games without a win, though the team still led the championship by as many points; he earned the most points of the club's four managers in the league-winning season.

On 21 September 2019, Toni succeeded Clarence Seedorf as the head coach of the Cameroonian national team. On his debut on 12 October, the team achieved a goalless friendly draw away to Tunisia. The Indomitable Lions took part in 2021 Africa Cup of Nations qualification despite having a spot in the final tournament assured as hosts; they topped their qualification group. After losing on penalties to Egypt in the semi-finals and then defeating Burkina Faso on the same tiebreaker, the team finished third.

Conceição was dismissed on 28 February 2022.

Honours

Player
Porto
Primeira Liga: 1989–90

Manager
Trofense
Segunda Liga: 2007–08

CFR Cluj
Liga I: 2009–10, 2018–19
Cupa României: 2008–09, 2009–10, 2015–16
Supercupa României: 2009

Moreirense
Segunda Liga: 2013–14

Cameroon
Africa Cup of Nations third place: 2021

References

External links

1961 births
Living people
Sportspeople from Braga
Portuguese footballers
Association football defenders
Primeira Liga players
Liga Portugal 2 players
S.C. Braga players
F.C. Vizela players
G.D. Riopele players
FC Porto players
Portugal international footballers
Portuguese football managers
Primeira Liga managers
Liga Portugal 2 managers
S.C. Braga managers
Associação Naval 1º de Maio managers
C.F. Estrela da Amadora managers
Vitória F.C. managers
C.D. Trofense managers
C.F. Os Belenenses managers
Moreirense F.C. managers
S.C. Olhanense managers
F.C. Penafiel managers
Liga I managers
CFR Cluj managers
FC Brașov (1936) managers
FC Astra Giurgiu managers
Saudi Professional League managers
Al-Faisaly FC managers
Cypriot First Division managers
Nea Salamis Famagusta FC managers
Cameroon national football team managers
Portuguese expatriate football managers
Expatriate football managers in Romania
Expatriate football managers in Saudi Arabia
Expatriate football managers in Cyprus
Expatriate football managers in Cameroon
Portuguese expatriate sportspeople in Romania
Portuguese expatriate sportspeople in Saudi Arabia
Portuguese expatriate sportspeople in Cyprus
Portuguese expatriate sportspeople in Cameroon